The 2022–23 ABB FIA Formula E World Championship is the ninth season of the FIA Formula E championship.

The 2022–23 season is the first season of the Formula E Gen3 car.

The reigning Team's Champions, Mercedes-EQ Formula E Team, did not return to defend the title.

Teams and drivers
All teams use the Formula E Gen3 car on Hankook tyres.

Team changes 
 Mercedes-EQ left the championship after competing for three seasons and winning the drivers and constructors titles in the 2020–21 and 2021–22 seasons. Their entry and assets were purchased by McLaren. This new entry uses Nissan powertrains.
 On 10 January 2022, Maserati announced they would be joining Formula E in the 2022–23 season, becoming the first Italian manufacturer in the series. It was later announced in April 2022 that Maserati had agreed a multi-year partnership with ROKiT Venturi Racing. It is the first time that Maserati is a constructor since leaving Formula 1 in the 1950s 
 In April 2022, Nissan announced they would take a complete ownership of the e.dams team, rebranding the team to the Nissan Formula E Team.
 In May 2022, ABT Sportsline, one of the old Audi team's key partners, announced they would return to the series with Extreme E partner Cupra under the name ABT CUPRA Formula E Team using Mahindra powertrains.
 DS and Techeetah announced the end of their relationship after four seasons. DS would instead partner up with Penske (one of the partners of the former Dragon team). Techeetah missed the 2022–23 season, with a view to returning to the grid for the 2023–24 season.

Driver changes 
 On 25 June 2022, TAG Heuer Porsche driver André Lotterer announced he would not return to the Formula E championship in 2023 as he was opting for a seat in the World Endurance Championship with Porsche in the LMDh Hypercar category. On 6 September 2022, it was announced that he would replace departing Oliver Askew at Avalanche Andretti.
 On 7 July 2022, Alexander Sims announced he would not return to the Formula E championship in 2023. On 12 August 2022, his replacement was announced to be Lucas di Grassi, switching from ROKiT Venturi Racing to partner Oliver Rowland.
 On 15 August 2022, António Félix da Costa announced his switch from DS Techeetah to TAG Heuer Porsche Formula E Team, replacing André Lotterer.
 On 23 August 2022, Nissan announced an all-new driver lineup, consisting of Sacha Fenestraz, who debuted in the 2022 season finale for Dragon, and Norman Nato, a Formula E race-winner who last raced for Jaguar.
 On 23 August 2022, McLaren announced René Rast's return to Formula E. He last competed for Audi Sport ABT Schaeffler in the 2020–2021 season.
 On 24 August 2022, ABT CUPRA announced their driver pairing of Nico Müller, who competed for Dragon in the 6th and 7th Formula E seasons, and Robin Frijns, who left the Envision team.
 On 6 September 2022, Avalanche Andretti announced the signing of André Lotterer, who was initially set to leave Formula E to race exclusively in the World Endurance Championship.
 On 14 September 2022, NIO 333 announced Sérgio Sette Câmara's switch from Dragon Racing replacing Oliver Turvey, who became sporting advisor and reserve driver for DS Penske.
 On 4 October 2022, Envision Racing announced Sébastien Buemi's switch from Nissan after eight seasons.
 On 8 October 2022, Nyck de Vries announced that he had signed with Scuderia AlphaTauri for the 2023 Formula One World Championship, ruling him out for a seat in Formula E.
 On 12 October 2022, Stoffel Vandoorne and Jean-Éric Vergne were announced to be the driver pairing for the newly formed DS Penske partnership. Antonio Giovinazzi, who raced for Penske in the previous season, left the championship after one season.
 On 3 November 2022, the Maserati MSG team announced that Maximilian Günther would be joining the team after leaving Nissan.
 On 29 November 2022, McLaren announced that Jake Hughes would be joining the team after previously being the full-time reserve and development driver for Mercedes-EQ.

Mid-season changes 
ABT CUPRA driver Robin Frijns sustained a wrist fracture on the opening lap of the Mexico City ePrix, leaving him unable to compete in the Diriyah ePrix double header. He was replaced by touring car and GT racer Kelvin van der Linde, who made his Formula E debut after testing for Audi in 2020.

André Lotterer will miss the Jakarta double-header as he will attend the Le Mans 24 Hours test day held across the same weekend. He will be replaced by Formula 2 and Porsche reserve driver David Beckmann.

List of planned races 
 
The following ePrix are contracted to form a part of the 2022–23 Formula E World Championship:

While it was originally planned to return to the format of starting the season at the end of a year and running until the European summer, the championship remained with a start early in the year for the third season running.

Location changes 
 The Mexico City ePrix became the season opener for the first time ever, taking over from the Diriyah ePrix.
 The Hyderabad ePrix will join the calendar after signing a letter of intent in January 2022, the first FIA World Championship event in India since the 2013 Indian Grand Prix.
 The São Paulo ePrix will be introduced, after an unsuccessful bid for the 2017–18 season.
 The Seoul ePrix Seoul Street Circuit first planned to change its layout for the 2022–23 season due to the redevelopment of the Jamsil Stadium area, but was then not part of the updated calendar.
 The Jakarta ePrix, which debuted in 2022, will become a double-header event.
 The Marrakesh ePrix will not return for the season as it was part of the 2021–22 calendar to substitute the cancelled Vancouver round.
 The Cape Town ePrix will be introduced after it was originally scheduled to debut in the 2021–22 season.
 The Paris ePrix was due to return to the calendar after being left out of the 2021–22 calendar due to the COVID-19 pandemic, but has not been included in the first announced schedule.
 The round held in the United States moves from Brooklyn Street Circuit in New York City to Portland International Raceway in Oregon.  The layout of the 3.166km circuit is expected to be modified.

ePrix locations

Regulation changes

Technical changes 
The championship began its third generation of technical regulations. This saw the introduction of a completely new car, with the new chassis again built by Spark Racing Technology. The cars are now powered by two powertrains, with a second one added to the front axle, increasing the maximum power output from 250kW to 600kW. This new car is the smallest and lightest car ever used in the championship, with its weight being reduced by 60kg. Increased power and reduced weight saw maximum speeds climb to over 320km/h. The addition of a second powertrain increased regenerative ability from 25% to 40%, enough that the new cars have no hydraulic rear brakes. The tyre supplier changed from Michelin to Hankook.

Sporting changes 
In addition to the new car, a number of race format changes were also made. The format returned to races run to a set number of laps instead of a fixed time, with safety cars and full course cautions increasing the laps needed to finish the race. Fanboost has also been discontinued.

Fast recharging will be tested in select races under a so-called "attack charge" format. During an attack charge race, each driver is required to pit for a recharge during the course of the race, but to compensate for this, drivers who pit receive two additional attack mode activation periods.

Originally, each team was to be required to run a rookie driver during at least two practice sessions within the season. Several teams criticized this rule: They feared that the tight race weekend schedule would leave drivers unprepared after just a single practice session and criticized the potentially high impact a crash by a rookie could have. The rule was eventually revoked. Instead, two extra sessions only for rookie drivers will be added on Friday before the Rome ePrix and on Monday after the Berlin ePrix.

Season report

Opening rounds 
Lucas Di Grassi took pole in Mexico on his debut for Mahindra Racing, defeating Andretti's Jake Dennis in the final duel. Di Grassi led away at the start. Robin Frijns' ABT Cupra collided with Norman Nato's Nissan, putting them both out of the race and breaking Frijns' wrist. Dennis would take the lead off Di Grassi on lap 12, before running away with the race lead. Porsche's Pascal Wehrlein overtook McLaren's Jake Hughes for third, undercutting Hughes by using Attack Mode a lap earlier. Wehrlein would then overtake Di Grassi for second on lap 20. Dennis won the race, 7.8 seconds clear of Wehrlein. Di Grassi held onto third place.

Kelvin Van Der Linde replaced the injured Frijns for Diriyah. Envision's Sébastien Buemi took pole in the first of the two races in Diriyah, ahead of Hughes and Jaguar's Sam Bird. Bird took the lead from Buemi on lap 7. Wehrlein, who had started ninth, made a move on Buemi for second place before overtaking leader Bird on lap 30. From there, Wehrlein would go on to take his second Formula E victory. Championship leader Dennis, who started 11th, would finish second. Bird would hold on to finish third.

Hughes would take pole for the second Diriyah race, ahead of Jaguar's Mitch Evans. Evans took the lead at the first corner. René Rast, Hughes' McLaren teammate, would then take the lead on lap 11 following the first round of Attack Mode. Wehrlein, who started fifth, would then take the lead from Rast, undercutting him on lap 17, taking his second attack mode one lap earlier than Rast. Wehrlein disappeared to take his second win in as many days, and the championship lead. Jake Dennis would once again finish second, with Rast taking McLaren's first Formula E podium in third.

In Hyderabad, it was Evans who took pole, ahead of DS Penske's Jean-Eric Vergne. Buemi overtook both Vergne and Evans for the lead on lap 7, and Evans dropped to third by lap 10. However Evans race would go from bad to worse on lap 13, being spun round by teammate Bird as Bird attempted a move on the Nissan of Sacha Fenestraz, taking both Jaguar cars out of the race. Vergne took the lead from Buemi on lap 15. Nick Cassidy, in the other Envision, had jumped from ninth to second after the second round of Attack modes on lap 17. McLaren's Jake Hughes then caused a Safety Car on lap 23, after his mirror had came loose and became lodged in his steering wheel, causing him to hit the wall. After the restart, Rast and Dennis collided, taking them both out of contention. Vergne held on for the win, taking his first win since the 2021 Rome E-Prix. Despite having more energy than Vergne at the end, Cassidy had to settle for second. The Porsche of Antonio Felix Da Costa finished third, his first podium of the season. Championship Leader Wehrlein finished 4th.

Formula E made it's debut in Cape Town for round 5. Sacha Fenestraz took his maiden pole position in Formula E, ahead of Maserati's Max Guenther. Championship leader Wehrlein ran into the back of Buemi on lap 1, causing Wehrlein to retire from the race. Fenestraz and Guenther had fought for the lead in the early running, however Nick Cassidy took the lead through the first round of Attack Mode. Guenther clipped a wall which forced him into retirement, elevating Da Costa and Vergne into podium contention. On lap 24, Da Costa pulled off a remarkable overtake on Cassidy for the lead. Da Costa attempted to take his second Attack Mode however missed the activation loop, handing the lead to Vergne. Da Costa pulled off the same stunning overtake on Vergne as he had on Cassidy. Da Costa would hold on to take the win, finishing 0.2 seconds ahead of Vergne. Cassidy took the final podium place after Fenestraz crashed out on the final lap. Despite not finishing, Wehrlein still leads the championship by 18 points.

Mid-season rounds 
Formula E made it's debut in Sao Paulo for round 6. It marks the third new E-Prix in succession.

Results and standings

ePrix

Drivers' Championship 
Points are awarded using the following structure:

Teams' Championship

Notes

References

External links 
 

Formula E seasons
Formula E
Formula E